Graphidastra is a genus of lichenized fungi in the family Roccellaceae.

References

Roccellaceae
Lichen genera